A list of Kannada language films produced in the  Kannada film industry in India in 2012.

Released films

January–June

July – December

Notable Deaths

References

External links
 Kannada Movies of 2012 at the Internet Movie Database

2012
Lists of 2012 films by country or language
2012 in Indian cinema